Reject Shop is a home-grown Malaysian chain store within the Metrojaya group of companies which focuses on retailing global branded garments which are off-season stocks, discontinued stocks, late order cancellations together with Metrojaya's own merchandise. Well-known brands from the United States, Europe and Australia find their way onto the shelves of Reject Shop. Since its introduction in 1990, Reject Shop now operates a nationwide chain of stores and outlets at leading shopping locations throughout Malaysia.

External links
 Official site

1990 establishments in Malaysia
Retail companies of Malaysia